The Torpedo Alley, or Torpedo Junction, off North Carolina, is one of the graveyards of the Atlantic Ocean, named for the high number of attacks on Allied shipping by German U-boats in World War II. Almost 400 ships were sunk, mostly during the Second Happy Time in 1942, and over 5,000 people were killed, many of whom were civilians and merchant sailors. Torpedo Alley encompassed the area surrounding the Outer Banks, including Cape Lookout and Cape Hatteras.

Sunken warships

Allied vessels
SS Empire Gem
The  was a recently built 10,600-ton British tanker, armed with one  gun, one 12-pounder anti-aircraft gun and six machine guns. While off Diamond Shoals on the night of January 23, 1942,  under Robert-Richard Zapp detected the unescorted Empire Gem and the unarmed American merchantman . A few hours later, at about 2:40 am on January 24, U-66 attacked by firing a spread of torpedoes at the Empire Gem. One of them struck the tanker at the tanks on the starboard side and the ship immediately began to burn and sink. The U-boat then fired additional torpedoes; one struck the Venore, which also sank. Both vessels sent out an SOS and shortly after an American motor lifeboat from Ocracoke Coast Guard Station arrived to rescue survivors. Fifty-five men out of fifty-seven were killed on the Empire Gem including Royal Navy gunners and another seventeen men were killed on the Venore. Twenty-three survivors from both ships were later rescued by American forces.

SS San Delfino
The  was an 8,702-ton armed British tanker. She was attacked east of Cape Hatteras at position  on April 10, 1942 by  under Captain Lieutenant Rolf Mützelburg. At 3:47 am San Delfino was hit by a torpedo but it had no effect. A second spread missed their target but a final shot hit the ship at 5:08 am, sinking the vessel, killing twenty-eight men and sending another twenty-two into the water. The action occurred early in the morning, and the gunners aboard had not been able to see a target. It took seven torpedoes altogether to destroy the ship. The Master and twenty-one crew members were rescued later on by the naval trawler HMT Norwich City and landed at Morehead City.

SS Empire Thrush 
At 3:15 pm a single torpedo hit the ship and it slowly sank. The master, all forty-seven crewmen, and seven Royal Navy gunners escaped without harm. The United States Navy Q-ship  witnessed the attack on the horizon but was unable to engage. Arriving two hours later, the Americans rescued the British and took them to Norfolk, Virginia.

HMT Bedfordshire

Bedfordshire was a 443-ton British trawler. On May 10, the Bedfordshire and HMT Lowman were deployed from their base at Morehead City to Ocracoke Island to search for a U-boat spotted in the area. When the vessels arrived they were discovered by Captain Lieutenant Gunther Krech of  who proceeded to shadow the vessels until later that night. Krech attacked after assuming he had been detected by the British ships - firing a spread of torpedoes at the Lowman but they all missed. The British then maneuvered and began dropping depth charges but these failed to destroy their target. At 5:40 in the morning on May 11, the U-boat fired a single torpedo at the Bedfordshire which missed but a second hit the trawler and it quickly sank with all thirty-seven hands. Two bodies were eventually recovered by the Americans who buried the dead on Ocracoke, creating the British Cemetery there.

HMT Kingston Ceylonite
The next warship sunk was the Kingston Ceylonite, another British naval trawler serving in American waters off North Carolina. On June 15, the Kingston Ceylonite was sailing off Virginia Beach in convoy KN-109 when she unknowingly entered a sea mine field laid by  four days earlier. The British trawler struck one mine at position  and sank. Thirty-three men went down with the ship and only eighteen survived. Two other tankers and the destroyer  also hit mines that night but were saved from sinking. Some of the dead washed up on Ocracoke Island and were interred with the men of HMT Bedfordshire.

USS YP-389

The small 170-ton American trawler  was destroyed during an action with U-701 in the early morning on June 19. German Captain Horst Degen decided to surface the submarine and engage with his deck guns in order to save torpedoes. Armor-piercing rounds splashed all around the American ship for an hour and a half before she sank. Because of a faulty firing pin in the trawler's  dual purpose gun, only .30-06 Springfield rifles, .30 cal machine guns and depth charges could be used to defend the ship. Of a 25-man complement, six American seamen were killed in battle and the eighteen remaining went adrift. The Germans suffered no casualties though U-701 sustained slight damage.

SS William Rockefeller
At 6:16 pm, Horst Degen's U-701 released a torpedo which hit the William Rockefellers pump room on portside amidships while she was steaming on a non-evasive course at 9.2 knots. The torpedo tore a twenty-foot hole in the ship and oil sprayed everywhere, causing a fire. The pump room flooded along with one of the ship's tanks and the cargo aboard caught on fire. U-701 surfaced the following morning around 5:20 am and delivered a coup de grâce which sank the American ship at position  without loss of life.

German U-boats
U-85

While operating within sight of Bodie Island Lighthouse, the destroyer  detected U-85 on radar at a range of 2,700 yards. The German submarine was surfaced at the time and she attempted to head south. When the Roper had closed to 700 yards, U-85 released a torpedo from her stern and began firing with her deck gun but the Americans evaded all of the shots. U-85 then turned to starboard and closed to 300 yards where the Americans opened fire with a  gun and machine guns. The sailors of USS Roper were able to hit the U-boat one time with naval gunfire before she submerged and then the Americans dropped eleven depth charges over the enemy and sank her. All forty-six German crew members were killed and twenty-nine bodies were recovered. Some of the dead were wearing civilian clothing and had wallets with United States currency and identification cards in them, suggesting that the submarine had been involved in landing German agents on the mainland. A nighttime military funeral was held for the dead Germans at Hampton, Virginia. The hatch of U-85 is now on display at Cape Hatteras Lighthouse and the enigma machine resides at the Graveyard of the Atlantic Museum in Hatteras.

U-352

, under Captain Lieutenant Hellmut Rathke, was destroyed on May 9, 1942 by the United States Coast Guard. At position , off Cape Lookout, the  picked up a sonar contact just before a torpedo exploded nearby. Lieutenant Maurice D. Jester knew right away that they were under attack by a submarine and he suspected where the Germans would fire their next torpedo from. The Americans maneuvered and dropped five depth charges, and when sonar detected the U-boat again, Icarus moved accordingly and dropped two more charges, forcing the Germans to surface. Then a short surface action occurred as Icarus opened fire with machine guns and prepared to ram the enemy U-boat. Before the range closed, the crew of U-352 evacuated their ship and the Americans ceased fire after dropping one last depth charge as the submarine sank. The Icarus left the scene and the German submariners still in the water but was ordered to return and pick up prisoners. Fifteen Germans were killed and thirty-three survivors were taken prisoner and transported to Charleston, South Carolina where they arrived the following day. Lieutenant Jester later received a Navy Cross for his victory over the Germans. The remains of the U352 lie in 115' of water, 26 miles South of Beaufort inlet, NC.

U-701

The destruction of  happened on July 7, 1942, near Cape Hatteras, and was the last sinking of a German submarine in Torpedo Alley. American Lockheed Hudson aircraft from the United States Army 396th Bombardment Squadron attacked the surfaced U-701 with depth charges. The attack was successful and the U-boat sank with twenty-nine hands. Seventeen survivors then went adrift in lifeboats for two days; when they were rescued by American forces, only seven remained. German casualties in Torpedo Alley totaled exactly 100 dead and forty captured. The submarine rests in 110' feet of water near Cape Hatteras, NC.

See also
List of shipwrecks of North Carolina

References

External links
 WWII German UBoats

Naval battles of World War II involving the United States
Military history of the United Kingdom during World War II
Naval battles of World War II involving Germany
Military history of the Atlantic Ocean